Abdirahman Omar Osman (also known as Abdirahman Yariisow and Engineer Yarisow; 16 August 1965 – 1 August 2019) was a Somali politician who was the Governor of Banaadir and Mayor of Mogadishu.  Abdirahman Omar Osman, also known as Eng. Yarisow, was involved in Somali politics for the last 12 years of his life. He served the Government of Somalia as a senior advisor, Minister of Information twice, Minister of Treasury, spokesperson of the government, Senior Media & Strategic Communications Advisor and Senior Advisor & Spokesperson of the Office of the President.

Early life
Abdirahman Omar Osman was born on 16 August 1965 in the district of Hodan, Mogadishu, Somalia, Osman obtained a BSc in Civil Engineering from the Somali National University before fleeing the Civil War in 1991 and arriving as a refugee in London. There he received an NVQ Level 2 in Business Administration and a Certificate of Higher Education in computing at a college. He then earned a master's degree from the University of Westminster in 2004, and served as a Labour Party councilor. He  was granted corporate membership of the UK Chartered Institute of Housing in 2006. In 2008, he returned to Somalia to help rebuild the country after the war.

Mayor of Mogadishu 
Osman was appointed Mayor of Mogadishu following the dismissal of the then Mayor, Thabit Abdi Mohammed, by President Mohamed Abdullahi Mohamed on 21 Septembre 2017.

Death and international reactions
On 24 July 2019, a female suicide bomber entered and blew herself up inside Osman's Mogadishu mayoral office, killing six government officials and injuring nine of Osman's staff. James C. Swan, the recently appointed diplomat and special envoy to Somalia of the United States of America, was the target of the bomber, but Swan had met the mayor earlier, leaving before the blast occurred. Osman was critically wounded in the attack, and he died from his injuries a week later on 1 August 2019, after having been transported to and hospitalised in Doha, Qatar.

Osman was mourned by members of the international community, including Swan, who condemned the attack as 'heinous.' His life was also commemorated for his long years of civil service and objective to improve Somalia's unfavourable conditions. The East African Islamist terrorist organisation al-Shabaab (the Somalian-based jihadist splinter of al-Qaeda) declared its responsibility for the orchestrating of the attack, claiming that the suicide bomber was one of their militants.

It is believed that Ikran Tahlil Farah, a former employee of Osman, who was herself abducted in Mogadishu in June 2021 and remains missing, may have been in possession of sensitive information regarding the attack.

References 

2019 deaths
Assassinated Somalian politicians
Deaths by suicide bomber
Government ministers of Somalia
Mayors of Mogadishu
Somali National University alumni
Alumni of the University of Westminster
Place of birth missing
1965 births